Norris J. Kellman (October 23, 1898 – August 10, 1993) was a politician in the State of Wisconsin.

He was born  in Galesville, Wisconsin. His father, Frank A. Kellman, served in the Wisconsin State Assembly.

Career 
Kellman was a delegate to the 1940 and 1944 and served in the Wisconsin State Assembly from 1939 to 1940. He served in the United States Army during World War I. He went to University of Wisconsin–La Crosse. He was in the insurance business and was the assistant postmaster in Galesville. He also served on the Trempealeau County, Wisconsin Board of Supervisors. In 1941, he was the sergeant at arms for the Wisconsin State Assembly. He died on August 10, 1993.

References 

People from Galesville, Wisconsin
University of Wisconsin–La Crosse alumni
County supervisors in Wisconsin
Employees of the Wisconsin Legislature
Republican Party members of the Wisconsin State Assembly
Businesspeople from Wisconsin
Military personnel from Wisconsin
United States Army soldiers
United States Army personnel of World War I
1898 births
1993 deaths
20th-century American politicians
20th-century American businesspeople